Night of Blood is a fantasy novel by Richard A. Knaak, set in the world of Dragonlance, and based on the Dungeons & Dragons role-playing game. It is the first novel in the "Minotaur Wars" series. It was published in paperback in June 2003.

Plot summary
Night of Blood is a follow-up to The War of Souls trilogy, and deals with the minotaurs of Krynn.

Reception

Review
Chronicle

References

2003 novels
Dragonlance novels